A bidet shower—also known as a commode shower, toilet shower, bum shower, shatafa  (شَطَّافَة) or bum gun—is a hand-held triggered nozzle that is placed near the toilet and delivers a spray of water used for anal cleansing and cleaning of the genitals after using the toilet for defecation and urination, popularised by Arab nations where the bidet shower is a common bathroom accessory The device is similar to that of a kitchen sink sprayer. 

In predominantly Catholic countries, the Muslim world, in the Eastern Orthodox and Hindu cultures, and in some Protestant countries such as Finland, water is usually used for anal cleansing, using a jet (bidet shower, bidet) or vessel, and a person's hand (in some places only the left hand is used).

Description 
The shower is a source of water for people who prefer using water rather than other methods of cleansing after defecation or urination. The shower is an alternative for the traditional sources of water for this action, such as the bidet, copper pot or bucket and mug, being more hygienic and compact. There is no contact between the spray of water and the used water drainage.

Usage 
The user typically grasps the faucet in the right hand and uses the thumb or forefinger (depending on the trigger location) to aim a spray of water at the anus or genitals to assist cleansing after using the toilet.

Prevalence

The bidet shower is common in most parts of the developing world where water is considered essential for anal cleansing. This includes India, Nepal, Pakistan, Egypt, Iran, Iraq, Maldives, Bangladesh, Brazil, Saudi Arabia, United Arab Emirates, Indonesia, Malaysia,  Philippines, Sri Lanka, Thailand, Vietnam and Cambodia. It is also common in Singapore. In those countries it is commonly installed in Western-style (sitting) toilet installations. In Thailand, it is common in both Western-style toilets and squat toilet installations. It is so ubiquitous that Thai parliamentarians were outraged on learning that the toilets in their new parliament building were not equipped with bidet showers. The bidet shower is similar in intent, if not method of use, to the Japanese washlet-style toilet seats, or so-called "electronic bidets".

Bidet showers are used by Muslims in Muslim countries and all parts of the Arab world as well as in Asia in order to cleanse themselves with water after using the toilet. Here, water is commonly used instead of, or together with, toilet paper for cleaning after defecation. This practice was made well known to European football fans visiting Qatar during the 2022 FIFA World Cup. In Arabic, the shower is called a shattafa (شَطَّافَة).

The use of water in many Christian countries is due in part to the biblical toilet etiquette which encourages washing after all instances of defecation. The bidet is common in predominantly Catholic countries where water is considered essential for anal cleansing, and in some traditionally Orthodox and Protestant countries such as Greece and Finland respectively, where bidet showers are common. In Europe, the bidet shower is used for example in Finland and Estonia. Bidets are more common bathroom fixtures in many southern European countries.

The average American uses  of toilet paper each year; every roll is estimated to require  of water to produce and an additional  each time it is used to flush the used leaves down the toilet (although the toilet will likely be flushed regardless of toilet paper usage). Given the environmental impact of toilet paper and wet wipes, bidets are growing in popularity.

See also 

 Bidet
 Hygiene in Christianity
 Islamic toilet etiquette
 Islamic hygienical jurisprudence
 Tabo (hygiene)
 Lota (vessel)
 Toilets in Japan
 Washlet

References

Plumbing
Toilets
Hygiene